Kaiya Rose Flintham Jota (born February 5, 2006) is a footballer who plays as a goalkeeper for the Philippines women's national team.

International career
Jota was born in the United States to a Filipino father and an English mother, making her eligible to play for England, Philippines or the United States at international level.

Philippines
Jota was first invited to train for the Philippines during their September 2022 training camp in California. Due to her inability to obtain her Philippine passport in time for the friendly match against New Zealand, she was unable to make the matchday list.

In October 2022, Jota received her first official call-up for the Philippines in their training camp and friendlies against Costa Rica. A couple of months later, Jota was once again called-up for the Philippines for their friendlies against Papua New Guinea. She made her debut for the Philippines in a 9–0 win against Papua New Guinea, coming in as a substitute, replacing Olivia McDaniel in the second half.

Personal life
Jota's sister, Asia, is also a soccer player who plays as a midfielder for Bethany Lutheran College in NCAA Division III.

References

2006 births
Living people
Citizens of the Philippines through descent
Filipino women's footballers
Women's association football goalkeepers
Philippines women's international footballers
American women's soccer players
American people of Filipino descent
American sportspeople of Filipino descent
Soccer players from California